The 2008 congressional elections in Ohio were held on November 4, 2008, and determined who will represent the state of Ohio in the United States House of Representatives.  The primary election was held on March 4, 2008.

Ohio has eighteen seats in the House, apportioned according to the 2000 United States Census.  Representatives are elected for two-year terms; those elected in November 2008 served in the 111th Congress from January 4, 2009, until January 3, 2011.  The election coincided with the 2008 U.S. presidential election.

Districts 1, 15 and 16 changed party (from Republican to Democratic), although CQ Politics had forecasted districts 1, 2, 14, 15, 16 and 18 to be at some risk for the incumbent party. District 15 was not decided until December 8, 2008. As of 2021, this is the last time that Democrats won a majority of congressional districts from Ohio, as well as the last time they won the House popular vote in the state.

Overview

Match-up summary

District 1

Democratic nominee Steve Driehaus won against Republican incumbent Steve Chabot. CQ Politics rated the race as 'No Clear Favorite'. The following candidates ran in the general election:

Race ranking and details from CQ Politics
Campaign contributions from OpenSecrets
Chabot (R-i) vs Driehaus (D) graph of collected poll results from Pollster.com

District 2 

Republican incumbent Jean Schmidt won against Democratic nominee Victoria Wulsin and Independent candidate David Krikorian. CQ Politics rated the race as 'Leans Republican'. The following candidates ran in the general election:

Race ranking and details from CQ Politics
Campaign contributions from OpenSecrets
Schmidt (R-i) vs Wulsin (D) graph of collected poll results from Pollster.com

District 3

Republican incumbent Mike Turner won against Democratic nominee Jane Mitakides. CQ Politics rated the race as 'Safe Republican'. The following candidates ran in the general election:

Race ranking and details from CQ Politics
Campaign contributions from OpenSecrets

District 4

Republican incumbent Jim Jordan won against Democratic nominee Mike Carroll. CQ Politics rated the race as 'Safe Republican'. The following candidates ran in the general election:

Race ranking and details from CQ Politics
Campaign contributions from OpenSecrets

District 5

Republican incumbent Bob Latta won against Democratic nominee George Mays. CQ Politics rated the race as 'Safe Republican'. The following candidates ran in the general election:

Race ranking and details from CQ Politics
Campaign contributions from OpenSecrets

District 6

Democratic incumbent Charlie Wilson won against Republican nominee Richard Stobbs. CQ Politics rated the race as 'Safe Democrat'. The following candidates ran in the general election:

Race ranking and details from CQ Politics
Campaign contributions from OpenSecrets

District 7

Republican incumbent David Hobson did not run for reelection in 2008.
Republican nominee Steve Austria won against Democratic nominee Sharen Neuhardt. CQ Politics rated the race as 'Republican Favored'. The following candidates ran in the general election:

Race ranking and details from CQ Politics
Campaign contributions from OpenSecrets
Austria (R) vs Neuhardt (D) graph of collected poll results from Pollster.com

District 8

Republican incumbent John Boehner won against Democratic nominee Nicholas Von Stein. CQ Politics rated the race as 'Safe Republican'. The following candidates ran in the general election:

Race ranking and details from CQ Politics
Campaign contributions from OpenSecrets

District 9

Democratic incumbent Marcy Kaptur won against Republican nominee Bradley S. Leavitt. CQ Politics rated the race as 'Safe Democrat'. The following candidates ran in the general election:

Race ranking and details from CQ Politics
Campaign contributions from OpenSecrets

District 10

The Democratic primary was held March 4, 2008, the same day as the Texas and Ohio presidential primaries. The candidates were Cleveland city councilman Joe Cimperman, North Olmsted mayor Thomas O'Grady, Barbra Ferris and Rosemary Palmer.

Kucinich previously stated that he would run again for Congress in 2008 if his bid for president were unsuccessful.

For 2008, however, Kucinich is facing four challengers in the Democratic primary scheduled for March 4, which prompted him to abandon his run for president. Opponents include Cleveland City Councilman Joe Cimperman and North Olmsted Mayor Thomas O'Grady. Having only raised around $50,000 so far compared to Cimperman's $228,000, Kucinich has since been putting out appeals for campaign funding on YouTube. Since then, he has managed to raise $700,000, surpassing Cimperman's $487,000.

Cimperman, who is endorsed by the Mayor of Cleveland and the Cleveland Plain Dealer, criticized Kucinich for focusing too much on campaigning for president and not on the district. Kucinich accused Cimperman of representing corporate and real estate interests. Cimperman described Kucinich as an absentee congressman who failed to pass any major legislative initiatives in his 12-year House career. In an interview, Cimperman said he was tired of Kucinich and Cleveland being joke fodder for late-night talk-show hosts, saying "It's time for him to go home". An ad paid for by Cimperman's campaign claimed that Kucinich has missed over 300 votes, but by checking the ad's source the actual number is 139.

A report suggested that representatives of Nancy Pelosi and American Israel Public Affairs Committee would "guarantee" Kucinich's re-election if he dropped his bid to impeach Cheney and Bush, though Kucinich denies the meeting happened. It was also suggested that Kucinich's calls for universal health care and an immediate withdrawal from Iraq made him a thorn in the side of the Democrats' congressional leadership, as well as his refusal to pledge to support the eventual presidential nominee.

At last minute, Kucinich took part in a debate with the other primary challengers. Barbara Ferris criticized him for not bringing as much money back to the district as other area legislators and authoring just one bill that passed during his 12 years in Congress. Kucinich responded
"It was a Republican Congress and there weren't many Democrats passing meaningful legislation during a Republican Congress."

Kucinich easily won the primary by a 15-point-margin over his nearest opponent Joe Cimperman.

Kucinich then beat Republican nominee Jim Trakas. CQ Politics rated the race as 'Safe Democrat'. The following candidates ran in the general election:

Race ranking and details from CQ Politics
Campaign contributions from OpenSecrets

District 11

Democratic nominee Marcia Fudge won against Republican nominee Thomas Pekarek. CQ Politics rated the race as 'Safe Democrat'. The following candidates ran in the general election:

Race ranking and details from CQ Politics
Campaign contributions from OpenSecrets

A special election was held on November 18, 2008, to fill Jones's seat for the remainder of the 110th Congress, until January 3, 2009, which Fudge won with 100% of the vote. See Ohio's 11th congressional district special election, 2008.

District 12

Republican incumbent Pat Tiberi won against Democratic nominee David Robinson. CQ Politics rated the race as 'Republican Favored'. The following candidates ran in the general election:

Race ranking and details from CQ Politics
Campaign contributions from OpenSecrets

District 13

Democratic incumbent Betty Sutton won against Republican nominee David Potter. CQ Politics rated the race as 'Safe Democrat'. The following candidates ran in the general election:

Race ranking and details from CQ Politics
Campaign contributions from OpenSecrets

District 14

Republican incumbent Steve LaTourette won against Democratic nominee Bill O'Neill. CQ Politics rated the race as 'Republican Favored'. The following candidates ran in the general election:

Race ranking and details from CQ Politics
Campaign contributions from OpenSecrets

District 15

The election results were essentially tied, requiring an automatic recount.
CQ Politics rated the race as 'Leans Democratic'. Republican incumbent Deborah Pryce did not run for reelection in 2008, leaving this an open seat. Kilroy defeated Stivers by 2,311 votes in a race not decided until the final ballots were counted on December 7, 2008.

Race ranking and details from CQ Politics
Campaign contributions from OpenSecrets
Stivers (R) vs Kilroy (D) graph of collected poll results from Pollster.com

District 16

Democratic nominee John Boccieri won against Republican nominee Kirk Schuring. Republican incumbent Ralph Regula did not run for reelection. CQ Politics rated the race as 'Leans Democratic'. The following candidates ran in the general election:

Race ranking and details from CQ Politics
Campaign contributions from OpenSecrets

District 17

Democratic incumbent Tim Ryan won against Republican nominee Duane Grassell. CQ Politics rated the race as 'Safe Democrat'. The following candidates ran in the general election:

Race ranking and details from CQ Politics
Campaign contributions from OpenSecrets

District 18

Democratic incumbent Zack Space won against Republican nominee Fred Dailey. CQ Politics rated the race as 'Democrat Favored'. The following candidates ran in the general election:

Race ranking and details from CQ Politics
Campaign contributions from OpenSecrets

References

External links
Elections & Ballot Issues from the Ohio Secretary of State 
U.S. Congress candidates for Ohio at Project Vote Smart
Ohio U.S. House Races from 2008 Race Tracker
Campaign contributions for Ohio congressional races from OpenSecrets

2008
Ohio
United States House of Representatives